The Roads and Transport Authority (RTA) was formed by the decree number 17 for the year 2005.

RTA is responsible for planning and providing the requirements of transport, roads & traffic in the Emirate of Dubai, and between Dubai and other Emirates of the UAE, neighboring countries in order to provide an effective & an integrated transport system. The Public Transport Agency provides public transport with a total of 1,616 buses. The PTA uses an expanded network of 119 internal lines, including 35 lines connecting to municipal stations, 12 city lines to transport passengers to other emirates, 62 internal lanes and 8 fast lines. The Dubai Bus network covers 82% of Dubai’s urban areas, and transports about 369,248 passengers a day.

Roads

Because of the growing population, commuters in Dubai experience a high amount of traffic congestion. The city has become the most congested city in the Middle East. Professionals working in Dubai spend an average of 1 hour and 45 minutes commuting to and from work. The government has invested heavily in the Dubai's road infrastructure, although this has not kept pace with the increase in the number of vehicles. This, coupled with the induced traffic phenomenon, has led to growing problems of congestion. However, as of May 2009, with thousands of expatriate workers having lost their jobs and left back to their countries following the economic crisis, traffic congestion has eased significantly.

Traffic congestion, the single biggest concern among Dubai's 1.44 million residents, inflicts losses of Dh4.6 billion or 3.15% of the emirate's Dh146 billion GDP a year. The city has a car ownership rate of 541 cars per 1,000 population. This figure exceeds that of cities like New York City [444 cars per 1,000 population], London [345 cars per 1,000 population] and Singapore [111 cars per 1,000 population]. If this trend continues, then by 2020, there will be 5.3 million registered cars in Dubai.

A further 500 km of roads plus 120 multi-level interchanges will also be built before 2020 at a cost of around 44 billion dirhams ($12 billion) as transport chiefs in the emirate aim to improve life for motorists.

Taxis
Dubai also has an extensive taxi system, the most expensive way to travel around the Emirate. There are both government-operated and private cab companies. The Dubai Transport Corporations operates cream-color taxis, with different color tops representing different franchising companies operating under RTA regulations. Some of the private cab companies are Cars Taxi, National Taxi, Cititaxi and Metro Taxi. The meter generally begins as Dhs.12.00 when a requesting a cab from the call center, and 5.00 Dhs. when taking a taxi on the road and is generally charged by distance at 1.5 Dhs./km.  The minimum fare charge depends it can be either 8.00 or 12.00 AED. There are approximately 9,497 taxis as per October 2015 located in the city. These cabs are available via the three major taxi booking apps - Uber, Careem and Dubai Taxi. With Careem being the largest taxi operator. (DTC).

Dubai Metro

The Dubai Metro currently operates three lines. The construction contract for the project was given to Dubai Rapid Link (DURL), a consortium led by Mitsubishi Heavy Industries, in 2005. The construction of the red line began in September 2005 and the red line started operating on 9 September 2009, with its extension opened in 2010 and 2013. There are currently 31 stations on the red line. The construction of green line started in 2006 and the green line opened on 9 September 2011. There were initially 18 stations and two more stations were added in 2014. The Green Line runs from Etisalat to Creek and the Red Line from Rashidiya to Jebel Ali.

Three new lines and extension of the two existing  are planned but currently no concrete construction plan has been confirmed.

Currently, the total length of the metro system is 89.6 km, within which 13 km is built underground.

Seven monorails are also slated to be constructed to help feed the Dubai Metro, connecting various places such as Dubailand, the Palm Jumeirah and other districts the main track.  The first of these, the Palm Jumeirah Monorail, opened on 30 April 2009. Four stations are in operation, while one more station is expected to be added in the future.

Bus

Dubai has a very large bus system run by the Roads and Transport Authority (RTA). The bus system has 193 routes on weekdays and transports over 30 million people weekly. The Public Transport bus system is large and advanced.

The (RTA) runs 1,616 buses around the whole emirate. From dubai logistics city in the West to the Al Quasis Industrial area in East Dubai. The buses will be of various sizes & models. The new fleet was expected to be fully operational by the end of 2008.
Under brand name Dubai Bus an extensive bus system is operated. Some bus lines are feeders for the metro system. 656 of 1500 bus stops are equipped with airconditioned shelters. The bus fleet consists almost entirely of low floor European-made, air-conditioned buses by Neoplan, Mercedes-Benz, Solaris and VDL. Although the city of Dubai is growing year by year, the number of passengers is hardly rising. It is possible that this is a result of constant metro extensions. In August 2019, the Road and Transport Authority (RTA) announced that a new night bus service (runs from 10 p.m. to 5 a.m.) will be launched, along with 11 more routes that will be enhanced in terms of timings and connections.

Trams

As of April 2008, there were two expected tram systems to be built in Dubai by 2011. The first was the Dubai Trolley, and the second was the Dubai Tram.

The Dubai Trolley is a  tram service that was planned to serve the area around the Burj Khalifa.  Announced in April 2008 by Emaar, the Dh500 million system was supposed have two separate lines. The first line, which opened by the end of 2009, ran  from Dubai Metro's Burj Khalifa station to the Dubai Mall with one stop at The Address Dubai Mall. The first line has trams running in both directions, while the second line only runs in one direction.  The second phase, which opened in 2010, serves ten stations.  The 4.6 km loop travels clockwise and has a total travel time of eight minutes.

At the same time, the Roads and Transport Authority (Dubai) announced the Dubai Tram ( previously known as Al Sufouh Tramway). This tram service runs  along Al Sufouh Road from Dubai Marina to the Palm Jumeirah.  It connects with two stations of Dubai Metro's Red Line. Phase 1, which was expected to open in April 2011, was finally opened in 2014; it has 11 trains with 13 stations running . Once Phase 2 is complete, the tram will add 14 more trains and six stations on the additional . The planning and construction of the Dubai Tram was undertaken by a consortium of Alstom, Besix and Parsons.

Running for 20 h each day, it will take only 30 min to ride the entire length of the system  The Dubai Tram uses Alstom Citadis 402s. To provide safety, comfort and aesthetics, the Dubai Tram corporates methods not found in many trams around the world. These trams use ground-level power supply; in other words, the trams do not need overhead cables. In June 2010, the consortium led by France's Alstom and the local/Belgian Belhasa Six Construct stopped work on the estimated $1.1bn Al-Sufouh tram project in Dubai because of irregular payments from the project client, Dubai's Roads & Transport Authority (RTA). The system is operational since November 2014.

Ports and water travel

Dubai is served by two large commercial ports, Port Rashid and Port Jebel Ali.  Various cruise ships dock in Dubai. Dubai Creek and Port Saeed are used by local traders in dhows.

One of the more traditional means of getting across Dubai Creek between Bur Dubai and Deira is on abras, small boats that ferry passengers across the Creek between stations in Bastakiya and Bani Yas Road, for a nominal charge of 1 UAE dirhams. They can be rented, along with an operator, for 100 UAE dirhams, approximately US$27.

The Marine Transport Agency, part of the Road and Transportation Agency, started the Dubai Water Bus System on Dubai Creek in July 2007. Years ago there used to be a seaplane service which used to take passengers to other parts of the emirates.

Air travel
 
Dubai International Airport is a hub for Emirates and FlyDubai and has a large duty-free shopping center. The airport has won numerous awards for its excellence in design and services. A third terminal, which fully supports the new Airbus A380, was opened in October 2008 and doubled the airport's capacity. A new concourse catering to the A380 was completed in late 2012.

Al Maktoum International Airport, that opened on 27 June 2010., will make a new free trade area within Dubai and be the centerpiece of the Dubai World Central aerotropolis. The airport was announced in 2004 and construction began in January 2005. The first part was expected to be completed by 2008. Although initially intended as a predominantly cargo airport, plans are afoot for it to handle some 120 million passengers per annum within 20 years, which would likely surpass Atlanta's Hartsfield-Jackson International Airport as the world's busiest airport. Since 2013 only a handful of airlines operate out of Al Maktoum International Airport in terms of passenger services.

Dubai is investing heavily in developing the reach of its airline Emirates. The hope is to develop Dubai's air transportation industry to the point that passengers from any city can fly direct to Dubai. When Emirates Airline receives the Boeing 777-200LR aircraft—part of its November 2005 order for forty-two 777s—it will be able to offer direct flights to nearly any major city in the world. The airline has also placed an order for 45 of Airbus's A380 superjumbo double-decker aircraft, the largest of which has a capacity of 641 passengers. The A380 aircraft have been flying since August 2008.

In addition Etihad Airways provides bus coaches between Dubai and Abu Dhabi International Airport for Etihad customers. Air Arabia provides a similar service for its passengers to Sharjah International Airport, which due to its proximity is used as an alternative airport by Dubai residents.

See also

List of roads in Dubai
 Nol Card
 Roads and Transport Authority (Dubai)

References

External links

Shane, Daniel. "Dubai taxis third best in world, says study". arabianbusiness.com. Retrieved January 7, 2017.